Karen Marie Winkfield (born 1970) is an American radiation oncologist, physician-scientist, and implementation scientist. She is the Ingram Professor of Cancer Research at Vanderbilt University School of Medicine.

Early life and education 
Winkfield was born in 1970 to a family of Jehovah's Witnesses who were opposed to formal education.

Winkfield completed a B.S. in biochemistry at Binghamton University. She earned a Ph.D. (2004) in pathology and M.D. (2005) from Duke University School of Medicine. Winkfield was the second black woman to complete the medical scientist training program at Duke University. She completed a radiation oncology residency at Harvard University.

Career 
Winfield was an associate director for community outreach and engagement and director of the office of cancer health equity at Atrium Health Wake Forest Baptist. In 2020, Winkfield joined Vanderbilt University. She is the executive director of the Meharry-Vanderbilt Alliance, Ingram Professor of Cancer Research, and a professor of radiation oncology at Vanderbilt University Medical Center.

Winkfield is the cofounder and director of the Association of Black Radiation Oncologists. She is an implementation scientist focused on using her experience with community engagement to improve health equity. Winkfield co-leads the Inclusive Participation Workgroup of the NIH CEAL teams against COVID-19 disparities. 

In September 2021, Winkfield was appointed by U.S. president Joe Biden to a six-year term on the National Cancer Advisory Board.

Personal life 
Winkfield was married to Jeffrey Walker. Walker was diagnosed with type 2 diabetes in 2003 and passed away in 2018 from complications of the disease. His medical journey influenced Winkfield to pursue patient advocacy.

See also 

 List of African-American women in medicine

References

External links 
 
 

Living people
1970 births
Place of birth missing (living people)
African-American women physicians
African-American women scientists
21st-century American women scientists
21st-century American women physicians
21st-century American physicians
Binghamton University alumni
Duke University School of Medicine alumni
Vanderbilt University faculty
Physician-scientists
Cancer researchers
American medical researchers
Women medical researchers
Implementation scientists